SønderjyskE (Ice hockey) is a professional ice hockey team playing in the top Danish ice hockey league Metal Ligaen. The team is part of SønderjyskE which is a sports umbrella with football, handball and ice hockey teams. The team plays home games in Vojens, a small town in the southernmost part of Jutland. SønderjyskE is the only team in Denmark which home arena has a narrow sized rink (common in North America and the NHL), whereas all other rinks in the country are standard IIHF sized rinks. Most of the club's foreign players are also originating from North America. SønderjyskE Ishockey Support is the fan club and the biggest icehockey fan club in Denmark with more than 800 members.

History
Vojens Ishockey Klub (VIK) was founded January 5, 1963 by Jens Peder Hansen on Fuglesøen, at that time an icy lake in Vojens. In 25 years Jens Peder Hansen ran the club as chairman. In the early years he was goalie and later coach for the elite team.

In 1965 the club was promoted to the top league in Denmark - 1. Division. In 1973 the club started to play indoor in the new Vojens Skøjtehal. After winning 3 championships with key players as Egon Kahl, Steen Schou, and George Galbraith, the club began to struggle in the 1980s and was relegated in 1987. Promotion in 1989 was followed by relegation the next year, but since 1992 the club has played in the top league in Denmark. Since 2004 as part of the SønderjyskE organisation.

SønderjyskE as an organisation was formed in 2004. In the 2003-04 season the hockey club was named IK Sønderjylland, from 1997 to 2003 Vojens Lions and prior to this Vojens Ishockey Klub (founded 1963). VIK still is the owner of the league license and runs the amateur teams in the club. In January 2011 the team moved to the new Syd Energi Arena (5,000 spectators, in 2018 named Frøs Arena) that is built in connection to their secondary arena Vojens Skøjtehal (2,300).

The top goalscorer and point leader in the club is Egon Kahl (373 goals and 309 assist (682 points) in 470 games). Kim Lykkeskov is the record holder for most games played (811 games). Former goalie Alfie Michaud has picked up several club records and in 2010 a Danish league record for time played without goals against. From 28/09/10-02/11/10 Alfie Michaud managed to play 360 minutes and 58 seconds without any goals against.

Achievements
Danish Championship
Gold (9 titles): 1978-79, 1979-80, 1981-82, 2005-06, 2008-09, 2009-10, 2012-13, 2013-14, 2014-15
Silver: (1 placing) 2018-19
Bronze: (7 placings) 1968-69, 1970-71, 1977-78, 2006-07, 2007-08, 2010-11, 2011-12

Danish Cup
Winners (4 titles): 2009-10, 2010–11, 2012-13, 2020-21
Runner-up (2 placings): 1998-99, 2013-14, 2014–15

Continental Cup
Gold (1 title): 2019-20
Bronze (1 placing): 2010-11

Champions Hockey League
Group Phase (2 placings): 2014-15, 2015-16

Players

 -->

 -->

 -->

 -->

 -->

-->

 -->

 -->

 -->

 -->

 -->

 -->

 -->

 -->

 -->

 -->

 -->

 -->

 -->

 -->

 -->

 -->

 -->

 -->

|}
Updated February 1, 2021.

Coaches

Notable players
  Egon Kahl
  George Galbraith
  Børge Gerber
  Ole Eriksen
  Bent Madsen
  Hans Lundgaard
  Torben Uldall
  Karsten Mikkelsen
  Steen Schou
  Frank Møller
  Bo Dietz-Larsen
  Søren Gerber
  Kim Foder
  Jan Jensen
  Søren "Tiffi" Nielsen
  Patrick Galbraith
  Kim Lykkeskov
  Pierre St. Onge
  Dusan Gregor
  Libor Herold
  James Richmond
  Mario Simioni
  Aleksandrs Semjonovs
  Todd Sparks
  Ian Hebert
  Dean Fedorchuk
  Brian Greer
  Chris Bartolone
  Magnus Lindqvist
  Stefan Nyman
  Jonas Vesterlund
  Brad Rooney
  Todd Reirden
  Eric Bertrand
  Dan Ceman
  Daryl Andrews
  Alfie Michaud

Notable coaches
  Harald Baklund
  Mario Simioni

References

 Søvsø, Michael og Per Jessen: Vojens på isen - en krønike om et ishockeyhold (2008). .
 Søvsø, Michael og Per Jessen: Vojens på isen - Den nye æra (2017). .

 
Ice hockey teams in Denmark
2004 establishments in Denmark
Ice hockey clubs established in 2004